The following is a list of episodes from the series SuperMansion.

Series overview

Episodes

Season 1 (2015)

Season 2 (2017)

Season 3 (2018–2019)

Specials

References

SuperMansion
SuperMansion